John Waring (3 October 1919 – 3 June 2004), also known by the nickname of "Sogger", was an English professional rugby league footballer who played in the 1930s and 1940s, and coached in the 1950s, and rugby union footballer who played in the 1940s.

Background
Jack Waring was born in Doulton Street, St. Helens, his birth was registered in Prescot, Lancashire, England. He was one of eleven siblings, he was a pupil at St. Teresa's school, St. Helens, he served as a gunner in the Royal Artillery during World War II, he lived in O'Sullivan Crescent, Blackbrook, St Helens , and he died aged 84 in Whiston Hospital, Whiston, Merseyside.

Playing career

International honours
Jack Waring won a cap for England while at St. Helens, he played right-, i.e. number 3, and scored a last-minute try in the 8–5 victory over Wales at the Watersheddings, Oldham on Saturday 9 November 1940, in front of a crowd of 5,000, he represented the Army, and the Combined Services/United Services (during World War II), against representative rugby union teams from; Australia, New Zealand, and South Africa.

Club career
Jack Waring made his début for Featherstone Rovers on Monday 22 November 1947, he played his last match for Featherstone Rovers during the 1948–49 season, he was transferred from Featherstone Rovers to Warrington, he made his début for Warrington on Saturday 9 October 1948, he played his last match for Warrington on Saturday 12 March 1949, he appears to have scored no drop-goals (or field-goals as they are currently known in Australasia), but prior to the 1974–75 season all goals, whether; conversions, penalties, or drop-goals, scored 2-points, consequently prior to this date drop-goals were often not explicitly documented, therefore '0' drop-goals may indicate drop-goals not recorded, rather than no drop-goals scored. In addition, prior to the 1949–50 season, the archaic field-goal was also still a valid means of scoring points.

Genealogical information
Jack Waring's marriage to Eva (née Mawdsley) was registered during fourth ¼ 1945 in St. Helens district. They had children; John Waring (birth registered during first ¼  in St. Helens district), James Trevor Waring (birth registered during second ¼  in St. Helens district), Freda M. Waring (birth registered during third ¼  in St. Helens district), and Denise Waring (birth registered during first ¼  in St. Helens district). Jack Waring was one of eleven siblings; he was the younger brother of Joseph Waring (birth unknown – died 1920s/1930s), Samuel Waring (birth registered first ¼ 1911 – died 1920s/1930s), Agnes Waring (birth registered first ¼ 1913), the rugby league footballer for St Helens Recs; William "Bill" Waring (birth registered first ¼ 1915 – died third ¼ 1939 (aged 24)), and Elsie Waring (birth registered fourth ¼ 1917), and the older brother of the veteran of the Normandy landings during World War II, and rugby league footballer for St. Helens, and Warrington (Heritage No. 517); Gerald "Ged" Waring (born 23 August 1922, birth registered third ¼ 1922), Walter Waring (birth registered second ¼ 1925) who was crippled and carried to school by Jack Waring), and the rugby league footballer for St. Helens; Thomas "Tom" Waring (birth registered fourth ¼ 1927).

References

External links
Search for "Waring" at espnscrum.com
Picture Jack Waring (Large)
 (archived by web.archive.org) Picture Jack Waring (Thumbnail)
Statistics at wolvesplayers.thisiswarrington.co.uk
Search for "Jack Waring" at britishnewspaperarchive.co.uk
Search for "John Waring" at britishnewspaperarchive.co.uk
Search for "Sogger Waring" at britishnewspaperarchive.co.uk

1919 births
2004 deaths
Army rugby union players
British Army personnel of World War II
Broughton Rangers players
Combined Services rugby union players
Dewsbury Rams players
England national rugby league team players
English rugby league players
English rugby union players
Featherstone Rovers players
Royal Artillery soldiers
Rugby league centres
Rugby league five-eighths
Rugby league halfbacks
Rugby league players from Prescot
Rugby league wingers
Rugby union fly-halves
Rugby union players from Prescot
St Helens R.F.C. players
Warrington Wolves players